The Mongolia Cricket Association (MCA) was established in 2007 in the Mongolian capital Ulaanbaatar by Battulga Gombo.

Founding
The Mongolia Cricket Association was founded to help develop cricket as a recognised sport in Mongolia, both at a school level and at a national level. Cricket is a very popular sport in Australia and it has a rich history. With the help of cricket enthusiasts and friends with passion for cricket MCA started organising regular cricket games and training sessions in Melbourne in 2012. Many Mongolian students have been involved in these activities and some of them became members of the Association. Over one hundred Mongolians and Australians have attended the matches and training sessions thus far. Battulga Gombo, the founder of MCA, has become the cricket coach after finishing the by Cricket Australia.

Activities
In Mongolia, MCA members and some alumni from Australian universities expressed their interest to support the activities run by the Association. Initially, MCA aimed to organize regular training sessions at some secondary schools in Ulaanbaatar, Mongolia. MCA sent some cricket equipment to Mongolia for Mongolian cricketers and students. The first cricket introductory program in Mongolia was launched by MCA at secondary school number 34 in May 2013 in Ulaanbaatar. The cricket program had a duration of four weeks and it resumed during the next school term. MCA planned to introduce cricket into more secondary schools in Ulaanbaatar.

See also
 Mongolia national cricket team

References

External links
 Official website

Cricket administration
Cricket in Mongolia
High school cricket
Sports organizations established in 2007
2007 establishments in Mongolia
Sports governing bodies in Mongolia